is a Japanese footballer who currently plays for Kashiwa Reysol.

Club career statistics
Updated to 28 February 2019.

References

External links

Profile at Kashiwa Reysol
Twitter

1985 births
Living people
Ryutsu Keizai University alumni
Association football people from Tokyo
Japanese footballers
J1 League players
J2 League players
J3 League players
Kashiwa Reysol players
Vegalta Sendai players
SC Sagamihara players
Association football defenders